Up Close is Eric Johnson's sixth studio album, released on December 7, 2010. It is Johnson's first studio release since his 2005 album Bloom. The album features guest appearances by Malford Milligan, Sonny Landreth, Steve Miller, Jimmie Vaughan, and Jonny Lang.

Track listing
All songs written by Eric Johnson, except where noted.

Personnel
Personnel are credited alphabetically.
 Roscoe Beck - Bass Guitar
 Kelly Donnelly - Engineer
 Kevin Hall - Drums
 Andy Johns - Mixing
 Eric Johnson - Guitar, Vocals, Producer
 Sonny Landreth - Guitar ("Your Book")
 Jonny Lang - Guitar and Vocals ("Austin")
 Malford Milligan - Vocals ("Brilliant Room")
 Steve Miller - Vocals ("Texas")
 Richard Mullen - Producer
 Kelly Toombs - Album Cover Design
 Barry "Frosty" Smith - Drums
 Tommy Taylor - Drums
 Jimmie Vaughan - Guitar ("Texas")

References

External links
 Eric Johnson talks about his upcoming album
 Eric Johnson's Up Close: full album preview
 CD Review: Eric Johnson - "Up Close" - PremierGuitar.com
 Eric Johnson Return Of The Vortexan - Guitar Player Interview

Eric Johnson albums
2010 albums